Gastr del Sol (derived from a combination of the name of a race horse (Gato del Sol) and David Grubbs' previous band Bastro) was an American, Chicago-based band, consisting for most of their career, of David Grubbs and Jim O'Rourke.  Between 1993 and 1998 they released seven albums ranging in genre from post-rock (the scene they were most associated with) to musique concrète.

Early line-up
Grubbs, a former member of Squirrel Bait formed the band in Chicago in 1991 from the final line-up of the group Bastro, with Bundy K. Brown and John McEntire on bass guitar and drums respectively. The trio released their first album, The Serpentine Similar, in 1993, ushering in a quieter, less rock-oriented sound with the change of name. Brown and McEntire left to join Tortoise the following year, and guitarist/composer/producer Jim O'Rourke joined.

Duo line-up
At this point Gastr del Sol became mainly a collaboration between Grubbs and O'Rourke, joined by an ever-changing collection of guests. Though McEntire was no longer a full member, he continued contributing to many Gastr del Sol recordings and concerts.

Most releases by this line-up were on Chicago's Drag City, beginning with the acoustic guitar-based Crookt, Crackt, or Fly in 1994. "Work From Smoke", the centerpiece of this album, fused Grubbs and O'Rourke's penchant for atonal guitar interplay with bass clarinet and Grubbs's increasingly surreal lyrics.

A pair of releases followed quickly in 1995. The Mirror Repair EP added elements of electronic music. The Harp Factory on Lake Street, released on the Table of the Elements label, was their most experimental work, a piece for chamber orchestra with only occasional voice and piano from Grubbs. Also in 1995, the band contributed the song "Quietly Approaching" to the AIDS benefit album Red Hot + Bothered produced by the Red Hot Organization.

1996's Upgrade & Afterlife included a would-be film score by O'Rourke, "Our Exquisite Replica of 'Eternity'", and an extended interpretation of the John Fahey piece "Dry Bones in the Valley" featuring guest Tony Conrad on violin.

With the release of Camoufleur in 1998, Gastr del Sol progressed further into the realm of conventional melodies and chamber pop, creating their most accessible and popular album. Its chord patterns, melodies, and flugelhorn and string-heavy arrangements prefigure O'Rourke's future pop releases.  The album was co-written with Markus Popp, of the pioneering German glitch group Oval, who contributed to the electronic aspects of the album.

After Camoufleur the band split up. Grubbs and O'Rourke have both continued to release albums under their own names in the fields of rock, pop, and experimental music.

Partial discography
 The Serpentine Similar (Teenbeat/Drag City, 1993)
 Twenty Songs Less (Teenbeat, 1993)
 Crookt, Crackt, or Fly (Drag City, 1994)
 Mirror Repair EP (Drag City, 1994)
 The Harp Factory on Lake Street (Table of the Elements, 1995)
 The Japanese Room at LA Pagode (with Tony Conrad) (Table of the Elements, 1995)
 Upgrade & Afterlife (Drag City, 1996)
 Camoufleur (Drag City, 1998)

References

External links
 Work from Smoke: A Gastr del Sol Resource
 Jim O'Rourke discography with details on other Gastr del Sol recordings

American post-rock groups
Rock music groups from Illinois
Musical groups from Chicago
Drag City (record label) artists